Ebony Victoria Flowers is an American prose writer and cartoonist who lives in Denver. Flowers authored the graphic novel, Hot Comb, which contains several short story comics that are a mix of autobiographical and fiction. She has been published in The Paris Review, The New York Times and The New Yorker.

Accolades
Flowers is a recipient of the 2017 Rona Jaffe Foundation Writers' Awards, won the 2020 Ignatz Award for Outstanding Graphic Novel for Hot Comb, and won the 2020 Eisner Award for Best Short Story for "Hot Comb."

Education 
Flowers received her B.A. from the University of Maryland, College Park (2002) in Applied Biological Anthropology, her M.S. and her 2017 PhD (titled  'DrawBridge' ) from the University of Wisconsin–Madison in Curriculum and Instruction.

References

External links
 Ebony Flower's Website

American women cartoonists
American women writers
African-American women writers
Living people
Year of birth missing (living people)
Place of birth missing (living people)
University of Maryland, College Park alumni
University of Wisconsin–Madison School of Education alumni
African-American writers
The New Yorker cartoonists
Eisner Award winners
American cartoonists
21st-century African-American people
21st-century African-American women